Townsend Historic District is a national historic district located at Townsend, New Castle County, Delaware.  It encompasses 216 contributing buildings and 5 contributing structures in the crossroads and railroad village of Townsend. It includes a mix of commercial and residential buildings primarily dating to the late-19th century and early-20th century. Notable buildings include the Immanuel M. E. Church and Parsonage, Lattamus store (1851), Dr. Niles house (c. 1910), Maloney Store, Townsend-Dickenson Hotel/Harmon's Drug Store, Evan's Store (c. 1900), Hart's Grain, Seed and Coal Store, S. Townsend house (c. 1840), Winfield Cottage (c. 1870), school (1932), and the former St. Mary's Episcopal Church.

It was listed on the National Register of Historic Places in 1986.

References

External links

Historic districts on the National Register of Historic Places in Delaware
Buildings and structures in New Castle County, Delaware
Historic American Engineering Record in Delaware
National Register of Historic Places in New Castle County, Delaware